Liane "Buffie" McFadyen is an American politician from the state of Colorado.

Originally from Buffalo, New York, she moved to Alamosa, Colorado, to attend Adams State University.

She served the limit of four terms as a representative in the Colorado state house, where she was the Speaker pro tem.

A member of the Democratic Party, McFadyen is a member of the County commission of Pueblo County, Colorado, first elected in 2012. She filed to run for the 3rd District seat in Congress in 2014 but stepped aside that March in favor of former state Senator Abel Tapia.

References

External links

Living people
Politicians from Buffalo, New York
People from Pueblo County, Colorado
Adams State University alumni
Women state legislators in Colorado
Democratic Party members of the Colorado House of Representatives
County commissioners in Colorado
Year of birth missing (living people)
21st-century American women